Michael Christopher Landes (born September 18, 1972) is an American actor of television and film.

Personal life
Michael Christopher Landes was born to Patricia and Bernard Landes on September 18, 1972 in The Bronx, New York.  Landes studied performing arts at the Stella Adler Studio of Acting in Los Angeles.

He met Wendy Benson in Boston during the summer of 1999 while they were filming The Gentleman from Boston; they married on October 21, 2000 at Saint Thomas Church in Manhattan.  According to Tribute,  they lived in Los Angeles with their two children: Mimi and Dominic.

Career
Landes made guest appearances on The Fresh Prince of Bel-Air, The New Lassie, and Blossom.  In 2016, Landes told Digital Spy that when he was replaced on Lois & Clark: The New Adventures of Superman after the first season—"because I looked too much like Dean Cain, who played Clark... and Teri Hatcher, who played Lois"—it was his first time being fired.  For his starring role in the television film Please God, I'm Only Seventeen, he was nomained for a Young Artist Award: Best Young Actor in a Television Movie, and in film, Landes also featured in Hart's War.

Television credits

Film credits

References

External links
 

1972 births
20th-century American male actors
21st-century American male actors
American male film actors
American male television actors
living people
male actors from New York (state)
Stella Adler Studio of Acting alumni